Portrait of Jorge Manuel Theotocópuli is a  painting by El Greco, painted during his time in Toledo. It depicts his son and collaborator Jorge Manuel Theotocópuli. It is now in the Museo de Bellas Artes in Seville.

Description
Jorge Manuel Theotocópuli collaborated with his father, El Greco, on many works. In this portrait, he is shown wearing black clothes and a white ruff, in front of a dark background. He holds brushes and a palette in his hands. The pictorial style is consistent with other Venetian painting.

External links

1590s paintings
1600s paintings
Theotocópuli, Jorge
Theotocópuli, Jorge
Theotocópuli, Jorge